Mawlawi Matiul Haq Khalis (born; 1961) is the Afghan Taliban leader and current President of the Afghan Red Crescent Society he also served as a member of the negotiation team in Qatar office.

Early life and education
He was born in 1961 in Nakarkhel village of Khogyani district of Nangarhar province, Afghanistan. He is the son of a late well-known Afghan jihad commander Mohammad Yunus Khalis. After studying early religious education from his father he then migrated to Pakistan in 1978 and studied in various madrassas in Khyber Pakhtunkhwa. In 1988 he received a Bachelor’s degree in Islamic law from the Islamic University of Madinah and a Master’s degree in Islamic studies from University of Punjab in Lahore, Pakistan. From 1990 to 1991 he studied Hadith at Jamia Imdad-ul-Uloom Islamia Peshawar. He is also a Hafiz-i-Quran

He and his brother Anwar ul Haq Mujahid led a group called the Tora Bora Military Front.

References

Living people
1961 births
Taliban leaders
People from Nangarhar Province
Islamic University of Madinah alumni
University of the Punjab alumni